"Clarity" is a song written and recorded by American singer-songwriter John Mayer, arranged with piano, with drums provided in part by The Roots drummer Questlove, and brass by two-time Grammy winner Roy Hargrove. It was released as the second single from Mayer's second studio album, Heavier Things (2003), on January 12, 2004.

Lyrics
The song's meaning is not immediately clear.  Many have interpreted the song as being about a person's own self-perception, and Mayer explained during an interview with Rick Dees in 2003 that the song "really sums up who I am as a guy...what it would be like to be in a room with me after I'm done 'being on'." Mayer also added that "Clarity" was about coping with the worries--especially unnecessary worries--of everyday life. Reiterating this idea at his February 28, 2007 show at Madison Square Garden, Mayer introduced "Clarity" as a song written about the first few seconds after waking up in the morning when you don't remember all of the problems and worries in your life. At the "Soundstage with Buddy Guy" concert, Mayer explained the song as one of the best he's done, in that it's the best in portraying his thoughts and feelings.

Commercial performance
"Clarity" peaked at number one on the US Billboard Adult Alternative Songs chart and number 25 on the Billboard Bubbling Under Hot 100 chart.

Music video
The music video for "Clarity" was directed by Director X. It was filmed on the Santa Monica Pier and the Pacific Coast Highway.

Personnel
 John Mayer – vocals, guitar
 David LaBruyere – bass
 Jamie Muhoberac – keyboards
 Lenny Castro – percussion
 Matt Chamberlain – drums
 Questlove – drums
 Roy Hargrove – trumpet

Charts

Cover version
This song was covered by saxophonist Najee for his album Rising Sun in 2007.

References

External links
 
 "Clarity" lyrics, at Yahoo! Music

2003 songs
2004 singles
Columbia Records singles
John Mayer songs
Music videos directed by Director X
Song recordings produced by Jack Joseph Puig
Songs written by John Mayer